PMR Records is an independent record label founded by Ben and Daniel Parmar in 2011. Initially building recognition as a quintessentially British outlet plugged in to local dance/electronic music culture, with a keen awareness of the trajectory of pop music, PMR was responsible for the early development of Disclosure, Jessie Ware and Jamie Woon who have gone on to have mainstream success. It also nurtured specialist dance/electronic music acts such as Julio Bashmore and T.Williams.

In 2022, just over a decade since its inception, PMR Records retains its influential status with one foot in the beating heart of the underground and one on the global stage of pop music with a slew of cult and commercial achievements, including international No.1s, BRITs, Grammy Awards and more. As of March 2022, its new roster includes Amber Mark, Briskin, Hope Tala and Ruti. In April 2022, co-founders Ben and Daniel were named among Billboard’s International Power Players.

History

Formation
Following a stint in A&R at Universal's Polydor, Ben left to manage Jai Paul. He persuaded his brother Daniel to join him in launching his own business venture and PMR was born. Its first ‘office’ was their family living room in Acton, West London, and the ethos was to create a music company truly committed to artist development with ‘real culture’, not about sales or mainstream wants, just music Ben and Daniel loved. PMR’s key launch objective was to ‘change people’s perception of what pop music is and what it should sound like’.

They took on Bristol DJ and producer Julio Bashmore for management and after putting out some singles on different independent labels, they released them through PMR, with January 2011’s Everyone Needs A Theme Tune EP marking its first home release, and spawning UK club hit ‘Battle For Middle You’.

Initially run in partnership with Island Records, early signings to the PMR roster included Rinse FM DJs L-Vis 1990 and T Williams, South London singer Jessie Ware, and teenage brothers Guy and Howard Lawrence, also known as electronic music duo Disclosure.

Early years success
Ben heard a demo of singer Jessie Ware, met up with her and connected immediately. She had a great voice but no songs ready for a debut album, so got to work on it with producer Dave Okumu (former frontman of The Invisible). During that time she was introduced by PMR to DJ and producer Julio Bashmore, a creative partnership that spawned the critically acclaimed track ‘110% / If You’re Never Gonna Move’ which ended up on her album. Released August 2012 on PMR / Island, the Devotion album peaked at No.5 on the Official UK Album Chart and was nominated for the Mercury Prize. Follow-up album Tough Love was released October 2014 and peaked at No.9 in the UK, as well as infiltrating the Top 50 of the Billboard 200.

Jessie was tipping a little-known sibling duo called Disclosure, and after remixing her track 'Running', they signed to PMR. They sent over a track they had called 'Latch', featuring a singer called Sam Smith and it ended up being released in October 2012 as the lead single from Disclosure’s debut studio album Settle ‘Latch’ peaked at No.11 on the Official UK Singles Chart and spent a staggering 55 weeks in the Top 100, propelling its performers and songwriter Jimmy Napes into the mainstream. US success saw ‘Latch’ chart at No.7 on the US Billboard Hot 100 chart in 2014. Follow-up singles charted high in the UK with ‘White Noise’ No.2, ‘You & Me’ No.10 and F for U (later featuring Mary J. Blige) at No.20.

Album Settle was released in summer 2013 and debuted at No.1 on the Official UK Album Chart and planted in the Top 100 for over a year, some 67 weeks. It went on to secure a Mercury Prize nomination and platinum status in the UK. Second album Caracal also debuted at No.1 in the UK, went Top 10 on the Billboard 200 chart, and No.1 on Billboard’s Dance/Electronic Chart. It received a 2016 Grammy Awards nomination for Best Dance/Electronic Album and was critically lauded, appearing in Top Albums of 2015 lists at Mixmag, Noisey and Slant Magazine.

In 2014, PMR launched sub-label Beat Club. A home to newer talent as its parent label reached wider success, Beat Club’s first release ‘People/Oh No’ was from Polish producer Klaves. It was also home to the first release from SG Lewis, the track 'Warm'.

2015–2020
In 2015, the management side of PMR counted Two Inch Punch, co-management of Dornik and Jessie Ware among its clients.

It continued its global partnership with Universal Music Group - with global marketing, sales and distribution services available from the likes of Virgin EMI and Caroline International.

In 2019, the Parmar brothers were appointed co-presidents of A&R at Virgin EMI (soon to be EMI Records) - defining a new era at the revamped legendary label while retaining ownership and separately running PMR as a partner label of the Universal subsidiary. Ben told Music Business Worldwide: “PMR has been an amazing ride so far, but we’re really excited by the prospect of scaling things up as part of a label with the global weight and influence of Virgin EMI. Their legacy and Britishness really sang to us and something feels very right about bringing our entrepreneurial spirit, energy and vision to a bigger, frontline operation.” Daniel added: “We have always been super ambitious at PMR and the success of Disclosure gave us a taste of how to break an artist globally. We’re looking forward to doing even more of that as part of Virgin EMI, bringing everything we’ve learnt building PMR from the ground up to the absolute powerhouse of Universal.”

2021: 10 years in business and beyond
PMR Records retains its reputation as a unique and quintessentially modern British institution that continues to build. Over a decade after its formation, independent success and mainstream breakthroughs with the likes of Jessie Ware and Disclosure, the PMR roster boasts some 1 billion streams annually. Recently, it refocussed producer/writer/remixer SG Lewis as a headline artist with his record becoming the ninth-biggest debut album on Spotify on launch (and saw 25k tickets sold for his US tour). New York’s Amber Mark released her full-length debut via PMR/Interscope to critical acclaim, and Hope Tala is one-to-watch from the UK with international buzz.

While in charge of EMI’s domestic artist roster, the Parmars continued to spearhead a refreshed outlook at the label. Developing talent and taking it global, they have been integral in implementing their unique spin into the operation since its relaunch as EMI in 2020. In 2021, they achieved success on EMI with TikTok-turned-UK-chart stars A1 x J1 and rising popstar-in-the-making Bree Runway.

Roster
As of October 2022, the core PMR roster consists of
 Amber Mark
 Briskin
 Hope Tala
 Jessie Ware
 Master Peace
 Ruti
 SG Lewis

The label alumni includes Disclosure, Jai Paul, Georgia & David Jackson ('Get Me Higher'), Jamie Woon, Julio Bashmore, T.Williams, Two Inch Punch, Couros, Cyril Hahn, Dornik, Girli, Javeon, Klaves, L-Vis 1990, Meridian Dan ('German Whip').

Testimonials

The 10 Best Record Labels of 2012 - Fact magazine
‘...with the foundations set by dubstep’s success, contemporary pop is more open to underground electronics than ever before, and was crying out for a label to become the de facto stable for artists straddling the boundary between both. But in terms of picking their artists, PMR has been flawless. The success of Jessie Ware’s Mercury-nominated Devotion remains the label’s finest moment to date, but the smaller scale signings of Julio Bashmore, Disclosure and T. Williams may, in time, prove just as fruitful: a close to perfect example of doing underground music on a major scale.’

PMR Records: the fresh face of pop - Guardian, 2013
‘[The label is] doing things its own way, and it could help end the domination of dull pop… signing future-thinking artists and bedroom producers from underground dance, somehow turning them into fully fledged pop stars without compromising their sound… [combining the ethos of a DIY indie with the quantifiable successes of a major]’.

GQ India, 2013
‘The label that’s taking those fresh UK club sounds to international charts.’

RWD mag, 2014
‘Over the last few years the power in the music industry has shifted where major labels once dominated, there has been a fresh injection of music lovers releasing music they love independently. Not because they were ticking boxes to send their artists straight into the Top 10, but because they were passionate about the music…’

Time Out London, 2014
‘When trendsetting label PMR Records offers you a showcase of their latest signings, you’d be crazy not to take a look. Since launching in 2011, PMR has catapulted fresh-faced sibling dance dons Disclosure, Mercury-nominated singer Jessie Ware and underground DJ hero Julio Bashmore into the big league. Now they’ve got the class of 2014 to introduce and, we think, some more fresh gold to offer us…If you want to dance to the pulse and keep your finger on it, this is for you.’

Music Business Worldwide - Label of the Month, October 2015

David Joseph (Universal Music)
“I love their taste and ambition. Conversations are only ever about two things: music and their artists’ careers. They naturally have a connection and communication that only close brothers can have and that emanates in everything that PMR do. It’s a new school family business.” 

Mark Gillespie (Three Six Zero)
“Ben and Daniel are living proof that if you put musical credibility before everything else, true success will follow. What they have built at PMR is really special and will continue to be for a long time.”

References

External links
 

Pop record labels
Electronic dance music record labels
Record labels based in London
2011 establishments in England
Record labels established in 2011